Benelli Armi SpA is an Italian firearm manufacturer best known for shotguns used by military, law enforcement and civilians, located in Urbino, Marche.  Founded in 1967 as an offshoot of the Benelli motorcycle factory that sold motorcycles through Montgomery Ward, Benelli produces the 12-gauge Benelli M3 used by American SWAT teams.  Benelli and Benelli USA have been owned by Pietro Beretta SpA since 2000.

Products

Shotguns 

Many Benelli shotguns utilize an inertia-operated system developed by Bruno Civolani.  In 1999, Benelli introduced the Benelli M4 Super 90, a gas-operated semi-auto shotgun intended for military and law enforcement.

The Benelli Super Black Eagle, used by waterfowlers, was one of the first semi-automatic shotguns capable of firing the 2.75-, 3-, and 3.5-inch shotgun shells.

Semi-automatic 
 121, 121 SL-80, 121-M1 (12- and 20-gauge)
 M1 Super 90 (12- and 20-gauge)
 M2 Super 90 (12- and 20-gauge)
 M3 Super 90 (12-gauge, hybrid semi-automatic or pump-action)
 M4 Super 90 (12-gauge)
 Raffaello (12-gauge)
 Raffaello CrioComfort (12- and 20-gauge)
 Raffaello Crio 28 (28-gauge)
 Vinci (12-gauge)
 Super Vinci (12-gauge)
 Benelli Montefeltro (12- and 20-gauge)
 Super Black Eagle I (12-gauge)
 Super Black Eagle II (12-gauge)
 Super Black Eagle III (12-gauge, 20-gauge)
 SuperSport
Ethos (12-, 20-, 28-gauge)

Over-under 
 828U (12-gauge)
 828U Sport (12-gauge)
 828U Upland Performance (12-gauge)

Pump-action 
 Nova (12- and 20-gauge)
 Nova tactical
 Nova field
 Supernova (12-gauge)
 Supernova tactical

Rifles 
 Benelli Argo 
Benelli Argo Comfortech
Benelli Argo EL
Benelli Argo Special
Benelli Argo Deluxe
 Benelli MR1 (chambered in 5.56×45mm NATO)
 Benelli R1
 Benelli Lupo

Target pistols 
 Benelli MP 90S
 Benelli MP 95E

Pistols 
 Benelli B76

Air pistols 

 Benelli Kite (Variant:Benelli Kite Young)

Submachine guns 
 Benelli CB M2

References

External links 

 Official homepage - Italy

 
Defence companies of Italy
Italian brands
Manufacturing companies established in 1967
Beretta
Urbino
Companies based in le Marche
Italian companies established in 1967
Firearm manufacturers of Italy
Sporting goods manufacturers of Italy